This is a list of streams and rivers in South Sudan, arranged geographically by drainage basin.  There is an alphabetic list at the end of this article.  The list may not be comprehensive.

The hydrology of the eastern part of South Sudan is complicated by the Sudd, a vast area of marshland into which many rivers flow and lose their identity.  Much of the water entering the Sudd is lost to evaporation, but much ultimately drains to the White Nile.  Ninety percent of South Sudan lies in the White Nile basin The three major cities of South Sudan are all located on the White Nile or a major tributary.

Flowing into the Mediterranean 
Nile (Egypt, Sudan)
White Nile
Adar River
Machar Marshes, into which flow
Yabus River
Daga River
Khor Machar
Sobat River
Baro River
Jikawo River
Pibor River
Akobo River
Agwei River
Abara River
Kongkong River
Kangen River
Lotilla River
Veveno River
Bahr el Zeraf
Bahr el Ghazal
Bahr al-Arab (Kiir River)
Lol River
Sopo River
Kuru River
Pongo River
Adda River
Jur River
Sue River
Waw Nahr
Numatinna River
Lau River
Gel River
Aswa River (Achwa)
Yei River
Kebe River
Kaya River
Kindi River
Kemi River
kizu River
Kembe River

Flowing into marshes
Koss River
Kidepo River
Medikiret River

Flowing into endorheic basins

Lake Turkana
Kibish River

Alphabetical list
 Abara River
 Achwa
 Adar River
 Agwei River
 Akobo River
 Bahr el Ghazal River
 Bahr el Naam River 
 Bahr el Zeraf
 Baro River
 Daga River
 Jikawo River
 Jur River
 Kangen River
 Kibish River
 Kidepo River
 Kiir River
 Kongkong River
 Koss River
 Kuru River
 Lol River
 Lotilla River
 Medikiret River
 Pibor River
 Pongo River
 Sobat River
 Sopo River
 Veveno River
 Wau River
 White Nile
 Yabus River

See also
 List of rivers of Africa
 List of rivers of Sudan

References

External links
Southern Sudan Topography
Topographical map of Eastern Equatoria
Topographical map of Jonglei

 
South Sudan
Rivers